Borjaki (also Romanized as Borjakī; also known as Burjaki) is a village in Khezel-e Sharqi Rural District, Khezel District, Nahavand County, Hamadan Province, Iran. At the 2006 census, its population was 168, in 40 families.

References 

Populated places in Nahavand County